Luke Howard is an Australian composer and pianist.

A piano student growing up in Melbourne, he was encouraged to develop his first improvisations by his piano teacher, Nehama Patkin. Later he studied at the Victorian College of the Arts.

His album The Sand That Ate The Sea saw him nominated for ARIA Award for Best Original Soundtrack, Cast or Show Album at the ARIA Music Awards of 2019. It is the soundtrack to a film by Matthew Thorne that looks at the opal mining town Andamooka, South Australia.

Howard fronts the Luke Howard Trio with Jonathan Zion (bass) and Daniel Farrugia (drums)

Discography

Albums

Extended plays

Awards and nominations

ARIA Awards
The ARIA Music Awards is an annual awards ceremony that recognises excellence, innovation, and achievement across all genres of Australian music.

! 
|-
! scope="row"| 2019
| The Sand That Ate the Sea
| ARIA Award for Best Original Soundtrack, Cast or Show Album
| 
| 
|-
! scope="row"| 2020
| All That Is Not Solid (Live at Tempo Rubato, Australia / 2020)
| ARIA Award for Best Jazz Album
| 
| 
|-
! scope="row"| 2022
| All Of Us
| ARIA Award for Best Classical Album
| 
| 
|}

Music Victoria Awards
The Music Victoria Awards are an annual awards night celebrating Victorian music. They commenced in 2006.

! 
|-
| Music Victoria Awards of 2016
| The Electric Night Descends
| Best Jazz Album
| 
|rowspan="1"| 
|-

References

External links
Luke Howard

Australian jazz pianists
Living people
Mercury KX artists
Year of birth missing (living people)